Jaffna Archaeological Museum is located in Nallur, Jaffna, Sri Lanka. The land was given to museum by Arumuga Navalar Foundation, and front portion has Navalar Cultural Hall. The museum houses a rare collection of antiquities. Buddhist and Hindu religious collection are in big collection, which are in various forms of metal, wood and stone. The excellent collections begin in time from the period of ancient period Sri Lanka to the colonial era. Also, some of the archaeological excavations findings of Kandarodai can seen at this museum.

Gallery

References

External links 

 யாழ் தொல் பொருட்காட்சிச்சாலை.

Cultural buildings in Jaffna
Museums in Jaffna District